Ole Knapp (8 November 1931 – 4 November 2015) was a Norwegian politician for the Labour Party. Born in Gjøvik in 1931, Knapp became Minister of Industry in 1990, serving until 1992.

References

1931 births
2015 deaths
Deputy members of the Storting
Government ministers of Norway
Politicians from Gjøvik
Labour Party (Norway) politicians
Ministers of Trade and Shipping of Norway